US Post Office-Kensington is a historic post office building located at Kensington in Brooklyn, New York, United States. It was built in 1935, and designed by consulting architect Lorimer Rich for the Office of the Supervising Architect.  The building is a two-story, six bay wide brick building in the Colonial Revival style. For much of its history it was painted white. It features a projecting pedimented wooden portico supported on Doric order piers.

It was listed on the National Register of Historic Places in 1988.

References

Kensington
Government buildings completed in 1935
Colonial Revival architecture in New York City
Government buildings in Brooklyn
National Register of Historic Places in Brooklyn
1935 establishments in New York City